The Bangladesh Swimming Federation is the national federation for swimming and is responsible for governing the sport in Bangladesh. M B Saif is the general secretary of the federation. Admiral M Shaheen Iqbal, Chief of Bangladesh Navy, is the president of Bangladesh Swimming Federation.

History
The Bangladesh Swimming Federation was established in 1972. It was formed by the Government of Bangladesh under the National Sports Council of the Ministry of Youth and Sports. It joined the Asian Swimming Federation in 1978 as a founding member of the Asian Amateur Swimming Federation. It has its own swimming pool, the Syed Nazrul Islam National Swimming Complex.

References

Swimming in Bangladesh
National members of the Asian Swimming Federation
1972 establishments in Bangladesh
Sports organizations established in 1972
Swimming
Organisations based in Dhaka